Kalikulanvayal  is a village in the Arimalamrevenue block of Pudukkottai district 
, Tamil Nadu, India.

Demographics 

As per the 2001 census, Kalikulanvayal had a total population of  
893 with 416 males and 477 females. Out of the total  
population 584 people were literate.

References

Villages in Pudukkottai district